Unlike most other provinces and the federal government, the province of New Brunswick until very recently had no statutory mechanism for electoral district redistribution. Thus, redistributions were not predictable and occurred only when consensus in the Legislative Assembly of New Brunswick demanded it. Throughout most of New Brunswick's early history redistribution was a result of the addition of new counties, upon which the districts were based, which expanded from seven in 1785 to fifteen in 1874.

Starting in 2005-2006, electoral distributions were undertaken under statutory requirements first immediately thereafter and initially after every decennial Canadian census starting in 2011, however the Act was later amendment to hold them after every two general elections.

List of electoral redistributions

1785 New Brunswick electoral distribution
1795 New Brunswick electoral redistribution
1824 New Brunswick electoral redistribution
1826 New Brunswick electoral redistribution
1827 New Brunswick electoral redistribution
1834 New Brunswick electoral redistribution
1838 New Brunswick electoral redistribution
1842 New Brunswick electoral redistribution
1845 New Brunswick electoral redistribution
1846 New Brunswick electoral redistribution
1874 New Brunswick electoral redistribution
1891 New Brunswick electoral redistribution
1895 New Brunswick electoral redistribution
1912 New Brunswick electoral redistribution
1924 New Brunswick electoral redistribution
1926 New Brunswick electoral redistribution
1946 New Brunswick electoral redistribution
1967 New Brunswick electoral redistribution
1973 New Brunswick electoral redistribution
1994 New Brunswick electoral redistribution
2006 New Brunswick electoral redistribution
2013 New Brunswick electoral redistribution
2021 New Brunswick electoral redistribution

History of districts

1784-1995
From the founding of New Brunswick until 1995, no electoral district crossed a county line. All districts through this time period can be traced back to one of New Brunswick's original 8 counties. From the 1973 redistribution until the abolishment of these districts at the 1995 election, all districts had 1 member.

1995-present

Politics of New Brunswick
New Brunswick Legislature